Racquet Club or similar may mean:
 Calcutta Racket Club
 Manchester Tennis and Racquet Club
 Racquet and Tennis Club, New York
 Racquet Club of Chicago
 Racquet Club of Memphis
 Racquet Club of Palm Springs, California
 Racquet Club of Philadelphia
 Racquet Club, Liverpool, England: its clubhouse was destroyed in the 1981 Toxteth riots
 Tennis and Racquet Club, Boston, Massachusetts, USA

Music
 Racket Club (album), an album by jazz guitarist Joe Morris released in 1998